Sharya Guruge (born 31 May 1992) is a Sri Lankan female squash player. She became a national squash champion in the women's singles at the 2011 Squash National Championships. Sharya has also competed for Sri Lanka at the 2010 Commonwealth Games

References

External links 
Profile at Commonwealth Games

1992 births
Living people
Sri Lankan female squash players
Squash players at the 2010 Commonwealth Games
Sportspeople from Colombo
Commonwealth Games competitors for Sri Lanka